Kahibah FC is a semi-professional football club based in Kahibah in the Hunter Region, New South Wales. Kahibah FC currently competes in the Northern NSW State League Division 1 with teams in First Grade, Under 19 and Under 17 divisions.

The Northern NSW State League Division 1 is the second tier of football in NNSW below the National Premier Leagues Northern NSW.

Kahibah Football Club was established in 1925 and is known as a local community icon synonymous with the enrichment of local people, young and old, through our football endeavours.

We have over 650 members in the club and play in various competitions throughout Newcastle, Lake Macquarie and the Hunter Region.

1925 establishments in Australia
Association football clubs established in 1925
Soccer clubs in New South Wales